Bainbridge Island School District No. 303 (BISD) is a public school district in Kitsap County, Washington, United States. It serves the town and island of Bainbridge Island. As of October 2006, the district has an enrollment of 4,280 students.

Schools

Elementary schools
 Capt. Charles Wilkes Elementary School (Grades PK-4)
 Capt. Johnston Blakely Elementary School (Grades PK-4)
 Ordway Elementary School (Grades K-4)

Middle schools
 Sonoji Sakai Intermediate School (Grades 5-6)
 Woodward Middle School (Grades 7-8)

High schools
 Bainbridge High School (Grades 9-12)

Alternative programs
BISD offers home-based and student-directed educational programming under the umbrella of the Commodore Options School:

 Mosaic Home Education Partnership (Grades K-8)
 Odyssey Multiage Program (Grades 1-8)
 Eagle Harbor High School (Grades 9-12)

External links
Bainbridge Island School District No. 303
Bainbridge Island School District Report Card

School districts in Washington (state)
Bainbridge Island, Washington
Education in Kitsap County, Washington